"Two Hound Dogs" is a 1955 rock and roll song composed by Bill Haley and Frank Pingatore. The song was released as a Decca single by Bill Haley and His Comets.

"Two Hound Dogs" was recorded in 1955 and released as a Decca Records single on June 25, 1955, backed with "Razzle Dazzle", as Decca 29552. "Razzle Dazzle" became the hit reaching #15 on the Billboard chart and #31 on the Cash Box chart in July, 1955 in a 3-week chart run. The recording was produced by Milt Gabler at the Pythian Temple studios in New York City and appeared on the 1956 Decca Records album Rock Around the Clock.

The single was also released in the UK on Brunswick Records and in Belgium on Omega.

The song also appeared on the Decca 7" EP collection Rock 'N Roll by Bill Haley and His Comets released as ED 2322 in December, 1955.

The release of the recording was advertised in Billboard in the June 11, 1955 issue on page 44: "Here they come! Two hound dogs! Their names???? Ask Bill Haley." The names of the two hound dogs were "Rhythm" and "Blues".

Other album appearances
"Two Hound Dogs" also appeared on the 1972 Bill Haley & His Comets album Golden Hits on MCA, the 1976 album R-O-C-K on Universal International, the 1985 album collection From the Original Master Tapes on MCA/Geffen, the 1991 box set The Decca Years & More on Bear Family Records, and the 1999 Universal album The Very Best of Bill Haley.

Other recordings
The Atomics released the song on the album Rock and Roll in Hi-FI on Musidisc. The group The Wellingtons performed "Two Hound Dogs" as part of a multi-artist medley during an episode of the U.S. music TV series Shindig in 1965. Johnny Dyer recorded the song on his 1995 album Jukin' in 1995 on the Blind Pig label. Fred Gerard released a version on an EP on President. Bogusław Wyrobek released the song in July, 1960 on an EP in Poland on the Pronit label.

Personnel
Bill Haley – vocals, rhythm guitar
Franny Beecher – lead guitar
Billy Williamson – steel guitar
Johnny Grande – piano
Marshall Lytle – bass
Joey Ambrose - tenor saxophone
Billy Gussak – drums

References

Sources
Jim Dawson, Rock Around the Clock: The Record That Started the Rock Revolution! (San Francisco: Backbeat Books, 2005)
John W. Haley and John von Hoelle, Sound and Glory (Wilmington, DE: Dyne-American, 1990)
John Swenson, Bill Haley (London: W.H. Allen, 1982)

 

1955 songs
Bill Haley songs
Songs written by Bill Haley
Decca Records singles